"Alive" is a song by Australian electronic music duo Empire of the Sun. It was released on 15 April 2013 as the lead single from their second studio album, Ice on the Dune (2013).

The single was certified platinum both by the Australian Recording Industry Association and the Federation of the Italian Music Industry.

Track listing

Music video
The music video for the song has acquired widespread notice. Directed by Alex Theurer and Charles Scott from Kelvin Optical, Inc., a division of J. J. Abrams' Bad Robot Productions. It features science fiction costumes and was filmed in Bryce Canyon National Park and the redwoods of California.

The animation starting at (0:45) depicts both singers standing on a rock tower, which is Spider Rock in Canyon de Chelly located on the Navajo Nation in Arizona

Usage in media
It is featured in the football video game FIFA 14, the films Dumb and Dumber To, Paranoia, Endless Love,  Alpha and Omega 4: The Legend of the Saw Tooth Cave, The Hero of Color City, Tony Robbins: I Am Not Your Guru and  Jexi, and the TV shows Camp, The Vampire Diaries and The Voice.

Charts

Weekly charts

Year-end charts

Certifications

See also
 List of number-one dance singles of 2013 (U.S.)

References

2013 songs
Empire of the Sun (band) songs
Songs written by Luke Steele (musician)
Songs written by Nick Littlemore
Capitol Records singles
Astralwerks singles
2013 singles
Songs written by Peter Mayes